FC NBU Asia is Uzbekistani football club based in Tashkent. Currently it plays in Uzbekistan First League

History
NBU Osiyo was founded in 2000 and in its first season became champion of Uzbekistan Second League and promoted to Uzbekistan First League. 2013 season club finished 7th in 2nd championship round of First League. After 2013 season finished club head coach Mukhtor Qurbonov left
the club and on 6 January 2014 was appointed as head coach of Shurtan Guzar which relegated to First League for 2014 season. In January 2014 Jafar Irismetov was appointed as new head coach of the NBU Osiyo.

League history

In 2004–2005 seasons the club league position and match statistics of 2nd championship round is given where club qualified.
In 2010–2013 seasons the league position and match statistics of 2nd championship round is given where club qualified.

Managers
  Ilhom Mo'minjonov (2011–2012)
  Mukhtor Qurbonov (2012–2013)
  Jafar Irismetov (2014)
  Ravshan Bozorov (2014–)

References

External links
 F.C. NBU Asia official site
 NBU Osiyo matches and results – soccerway

Football clubs in Uzbekistan
2000 establishments in Uzbekistan
Association football clubs established in 2000
Football clubs in Tashkent